Manuel María de Peralta y López del Corral  (died 1837) was a Costa Rican politician.  He was involved in Costa Rica's 1835 civil war.

Costa Rican politicians
Year of birth missing
1837 deaths
Costa Rican monarchists